The Taegŏn Line is an electrified standard-gauge secondary line of the Korean State Railway in South P'yŏngan Province, North Korea. It runs from Sillyŏnp'o Station on the P'yŏngra Line via Taegŏn on the Ŭnsan Line to Pongch'ang station.

Route
A yellow background in the "Distance" box indicates that section of the line is not electrified.

References

Railway lines in North Korea
Standard gauge railways in North Korea